Point Lay LRRS Airport  is a public and military use airport owned by the United States Government and located in Point Lay, in the North Slope Borough of the U.S. state of Alaska. It is also known as Point Lay Airport. The acronym LRRS stands for Long Range Radar Site or Long Range Radar Station.

Facilities and aircraft 
Point Lay LRRS Airport has one runway designated 5/23 with a gravel surface measuring 3,519 by 80 feet (1,073 x 24 m).

For the 12-month period ending December 31, 2005, the airport had 120 aircraft operations, an average of 10 per month: 42% air taxi, 42% military and 16% general aviation.

Airlines and destinations 

Prior to its bankruptcy and cessation of all operations, Ravn Alaska served the airport from multiple locations.

Top destinations

History
The airport was built in 1957 to support the Distant Early Warning Line Radar station at Point Lay (LIZ-2). The station was logistically supported by the 711th Aircraft Control and Warning Squadron based at Cape Lisburne Air Force Station, although Point Lay was operated by civilian contract workers.

The radar station was upgraded in the late 1980s with new radars and in 1989 was re-designated part of the North Warning System (NWS) as a Long Range Radar Site, A-15, controlled by the Pacific Air Forces 611th Air Support Group, based at Elmendorf AFB.

The LRR site was inactivated in 1989 due to soil erosion and budget concerns. After its closure, the radar was removed in August 1998 and other military buildings were removed around 2000, returning the site to a natural condition. The airport remains open to support the small settlement at Point Lay.

See also
 North Warning System
 Distant Early Warning Line
 Alaskan Air Command
 Eleventh Air Force

References 

  The DEW Line

External links 
 FAA Alaska airport diagram (GIF)
 

Installations of the United States Air Force in Alaska
Airports in North Slope Borough, Alaska
1957 establishments in Alaska
Airports established in 1957
Military installations established in 1957